Labulla thoracica is a species of spider belonging to the family Linyphiidae.

It is native to Europe.

References

Linyphiidae
Spiders described in 1834